Metford railway station is located on the Main Northern line in New South Wales, Australia. It serves Metford in the eastern suburbs of Maitland, opening on 17 March 1995.

Platforms & services
Metford has one island platform with two faces. It is serviced by NSW TrainLink Hunter Line services travelling from Newcastle to Maitland, Muswellbrook, Scone, Telarah and Dungog.

Transport links
Hunter Valley Buses operate one route via Metford station:
181: Woodberry to Rutherford

References

External links

Metford station details Transport for New South Wales

Easy Access railway stations in New South Wales
Maitland, New South Wales
Railway stations in the Hunter Region
Railway stations in Australia opened in 1995
Regional railway stations in New South Wales
Main North railway line, New South Wales